Anna Genover-Mas (born 1963) is a Catalan journalist and writer of children's books, one of which won the Vicenta Ferrer Vila de Paterna prize for the best children's literature book of 2007.

Genover-Mas was born in Girona in 1963. She studied journalism (BA, with Honors, Universitat Autònoma de Barcelona (UAB)) and worked freelance for Spanish TV. Later she did cinema studies at NYU (postgrad in Cinematography) and Screenwriting at UCLA. 

She now lives in Barcelona.

Several of her books have been translated into English. The Grumpy Gardener (Catalan: La Jardinera Rondinaire), an ecological adventure, was published in April 2008, and two other books, the prize-winning The Hungry Sprout and The Treasure of Pakamotu are forthcoming.

References

External links
  with Biografia 
 The Grumpy Gardener website (archived 2012-03-19)

1963 births
Writers from Catalonia
Journalists from Catalonia
Spanish children's writers
Spanish women children's writers
Living people
Tisch School of the Arts alumni
University of California, Los Angeles alumni
Autonomous University of Barcelona alumni